The Battle of Storsjön (Slaget på Storsjöns is) was fought during 1178 outside Sunne, in Jämtland province, Sweden. The battle was won  by the Birkebeiner army of King Sverre of Norway.

The battle was conducted near Lake Storsjön, which was then covered with ice. Due to darkness, Sverre and his troops pulled away while local peasants fought against each other. When dawn came, the Birkebeiner forces attacked and won a victory. As a consequences of this defeat, Jämtland was incorporated into Norway until it was ceded to Sweden in 1645.

According to the Sverris saga, the Jamts were mostly killed by sword blows in their backs. This is supported by archaeological findings from the 20th century.

References

Other sources
 Ashlund, Nils  (1948) Jämtlands och Härjedalens historia  D. 1, Intill 1537 (Norstedts Förlag) (In Swedish)
 Helle, Knut (1995) Under kirke og kongemakt: 1130-1350 (Aschehoug Universitetsforlaget)  (in Norwegian) 
 Krag, Claus (2005) Sverre: Norges største middelalderkonge (Aschehoug Universitetsforlaget) (in Norwegian)

Further reading
Egervärn, Erik Arthur; Järnankar, Frans (1993) Jämtlands och Härjedalens historia (Hjo: Sandtorp Consult AB)    (In Swedish)
Ekerwald, Carl-Göran (2004) Jämtarnas Historia intill 1319 (Östersund: Jengel, Förlaget för Jemtlandica)  (in Norwegian) 
Holmsen, Andreas (1939) Norges historie fra de eldste tider til 1660  (Universitetsforlaget AS)  (in Norwegian)

External links
The History of Jamtland (Bo Oscarsson)

Storsjon
Storsjon
Conflicts in 1178
1178 in Europe
12th century in Sweden
12th century in Norway